The Java Depot, a combination passenger and freight railway station in Java, South Dakota, was built in 1901 by the Chicago, Milwaukee, and St. Paul Railway.  It was listed on the National Register of Historic Places in 2001.

Started in the spring of 1901, it was built to a standardized plan and was completed quickly, in July.  It served as a passenger depot until 1975, when passenger service was discontinued.

References

Railway stations on the National Register of Historic Places in South Dakota
Railway stations in the United States opened in 1901
National Register of Historic Places in Walworth County, South Dakota
Former Chicago, Milwaukee, St. Paul and Pacific Railroad stations
Transportation in Walworth County, South Dakota
Former railway stations in South Dakota